George F. Thompson (July 24, 1870 – June 1948) was an American lawyer and politician from New York.

Life
He was born on July 24, 1870, in Saratoga Springs, New York. His family moved to Royalton in 1883. He studied law, was admitted to the bar in 1893, and practiced law in Middleport. He was elected a Justice of the Peace in 1895.

Thompson was a Republican member of the New York State Assembly (Niagara Co., 1st D.) in 1904 and 1905.

He was a member of the New York State Senate (47th D.) from 1913 to 1920, sitting in the 136th, 137th, 138th, 139th, 140th, 141st, 142nd and 143rd New York State Legislatures.

In September 1920, Thompson lost the Republican primary for Governor to Nathan L. Miller. In November, he ran at the New York state election, 1920, on the Prohibition ticket for the office but was again defeated by Miller.

Sources
 Official New York from Cleveland to Hughes by Charles Elliott Fitch (Hurd Publishing Co., New York and Buffalo, 1911, Vol. IV; pg. 349 and 351)
 PRIMARY RIVALS CLASH TOMORROW in NYT on September 13, 1920
 G. F. THOMPSON DIES; RAN FOR GOVERNOR in NYT on June 14, 1948 (subscription required)
 Bio transcribed from Landmarks of Niagara County, New York by William Pool (1897)

1870 births
1948 deaths
Republican Party New York (state) state senators
People from Royalton, New York
Republican Party members of the New York State Assembly
New York (state) Prohibitionists
Politicians from Saratoga Springs, New York
Activists from New York (state)